Alexandru Codreanu is a diplomat from the Republic of Moldova. He is the Ambassador of Moldova to Hungary.

References

http://www.ungaria.mfa.md
http://www.ungaria.mfa.md/img/docs/cv-alexandru-codreanu-2013.pdf

http://www.ungaria.mfa.md

Living people
Ambassadors of Moldova to Hungary
Year of birth missing (living people)